Kristiansund may refer to:

Places
Kristiansund, a municipality in Møre og Romsdal county, Norway
Kristiansund (town), a town in Kristiansund Municipality in Møre og Romsdal county, Norway

Sports
Kristiansund BK, a Norwegian association football club located in Kristiansund, Norway
Kristiansund FK, a former Norwegian association football club located in Kristiansund, Norway
Kristiansund Stadion, a football stadium located at Karihola in Kristiansund, Norway

Transportation
Kristiansund Airport, Kvernberget, an airport in Kristiansund, Norway